Ilham Jaya Kesuma (born 19 September 1978) is a former Indonesian professional footballer who last played as a striker for Sriwijaya F.C. in Indonesia Super League.

Ilham was born in Palembang and played youth football with PS Palembang. Ilham starting his professional career with Persita. He is top scorer in Tiger Cup 2004 with 7 goal for Indonesia. He was also topscorer in Liga Indonesia 2004 with 22 goals.

Honours

Club
Persita Tangerang
 Liga Indonesia First Division: 2000

Persisam Putra Samarinda
 Liga Indonesia Premier Division: 2008–09

International
 AFF Championship
 Runners-up (1) : 2004

Individual honors
 Liga Indonesia Top Scorer : Persita Tangerang (2002)
 Liga Indonesia Player of the Year : Persita Tangerang (2002)
 Liga Indonesia Top Scorer : Persita Tangerang (2004)
 2004 Tiger Cup Top scorer :  Indonesia (2004)

International goals

|}

References

External links 
 
 His profil (Indonesian)

Indonesian footballers
Living people
1978 births
Indonesia international footballers
Indonesian expatriate footballers
Expatriate footballers in Malaysia
People from Palembang
Persisam Putra Samarinda players
Sriwijaya F.C. players
Persita Tangerang players
Mitra Kukar players
Indonesian expatriate sportspeople in Malaysia
Malaysia Super League players
Liga 1 (Indonesia) players
Association football forwards